Elmer Ellsworth "Mike" Smith (March 23, 1868 – November 3, 1945) was an American professional baseball player who played as a pitcher and as an outfielder for 14 seasons in the major leagues from 1886 to 1901.  He began his career as a pitcher for the Cincinnati Red Stockings, leading the AA in earned run average in 1887, then switched to playing the outfield when he began playing for the Pittsburgh Pirates in 1892.   He returned the Reds for three seasons from 1898 to 1900, and then played one partial season with the New York Giants.  He appeared in four games for the Pirates in 1901, then finished the season, and his career, with the Boston Beaneaters.

See also
 List of Major League Baseball career triples leaders
 List of Major League Baseball career stolen bases leaders
 List of Major League Baseball annual ERA leaders

References

External links

1868 births
1945 deaths
Major League Baseball outfielders
Baseball players from Pittsburgh
Cincinnati Red Stockings (AA) players
Pittsburgh Pirates players
Cincinnati Reds players
New York Giants (NL) players
Boston Beaneaters players
19th-century baseball players
Kansas City Blues (baseball) players
Minneapolis Millers (baseball) players
Columbus Senators players
Ilion Typewriters players
Wilkes-Barre Barons (baseball) players
Binghamton Bingoes players
Nashville Americans players